Bela Katona (21 April 1920 – 5 February 2018)) was a Hungarian violinist.

Life and career
He was born in Pozsony (now-Bratislava) and the age of 19 Bela Katona entered the Franz Liszt Academy in Budapest to study with the teacher Ede Zathureczky, formerly assistant to Jeno Hubay, later becoming his teaching assistant. Ernő Dohnányi was at that time the Academy's director and Béla Bartók was professor of piano.

Revered as a teacher in his native Hungary, Katona moved to England in 1960 where he has continued to teach.  His students have included many of today's most accomplished violinists. Alumni of his class are now significant teachers in their own rights: Dona Lee Croft of the Royal College of Music, London, and Kazuki Sawa of Tokyo National University of Fine Arts are examples. Other notable students include violinists Thomas Bowes and Cynthia Fleming (Leader, BBC Concert Orchestra, 2003-2014).

References

Sources
 Biography of Bela Katona at Ciaccona International Music Course
 Biography of Dona Lee Croft at the Royal College of Music
 Biography of Kazuki Sawa from Aspen Artists

1920 births
2018 deaths
Franz Liszt Academy of Music alumni
Hungarian violinists
Male violinists
Hungarian music educators
Czechoslovak emigrants to Hungary
Hungarian emigrants to the United Kingdom